Winding the Skein is an oil painting by Frederic Leighton, first exhibited in 1878.

Description 
Two canvases by Leighton were hung at the Royal Academy in 1878, the year of his enthronement as President: Winding and Skein and Nausicaa. Edgcumbe Staley gives the following description of the first picture:

Analysis 
In this picture, a simple theme is treated in a classic fashion—not dissimilar to that employed for the earlier Music Lesson. Ernest Rhys writes in praise of this perceived quality in Leighton:

See also 

 Greeks in Syria

References

Sources 

 Ash, Russell (1995). Lord Leighton. London: Pavilion Books Limited. p. 55 [Plate 20].
 Jones, Stephen, et al. (1996). Frederic Leighton, 1830–1896. Royal Academy of Arts, London: Harry N. Abrams, Inc. pp. 52, 179, 185, 186, 206.
 Rhys, Ernest (1900). Frederic Lord Leighton: An Illustrated Record of his Life and Work. London: George Bell & Sons. pp. 37, 111, 126.
 Staley, Edgcumbe (1906). Lord Leighton of Stretton. London: The Walter Scott Publishing Co., Ltd.; New York: Charles Scribner's Sons. pp. 112, 217. 
 Trumble, Angus (4 December 2005). "Winding the skein". The Victorian Web. Accessed 2 July 2022.
 "Winding the skein, circa 1878 by Lord Frederic Leighton". Art Gallery of NSW. Accessed 2 July 2022.

1878 paintings
Paintings by Frederic Leighton